Still No Commercial Potential is the eighth studio album by Djam Karet, released in 1998 by HC Productions.

Track listing

Personnel 
Adapted from Still No Commercial Potential liner notes.

Djam Karet
 Gayle Ellett – electric guitar, organ, percussion
 Mike Henderson – electric guitar, engineering
 Chuck Oken, Jr. – drums, percussion, keyboards
 Henry J. Osborne – 5-string bass guitar, didgeridoo, percussion

Production and additional personnel
 Djam Karet – production, cover art, design
 Bill Ellsworth – cover art, design
 Matt Murman – mastering

Release history

References

External links 
 
 Still No Commercial Potential at Bandcamp

1998 albums
Djam Karet albums